Candor Chasma is one of the largest canyons in the Valles Marineris canyon system on Mars. The feature is geographically divided into two halves: East and West Candor Chasmas, respectively. It is unclear how the canyon originally formed; one theory is that it was expanded and deepened by tectonic processes similar to a graben, while another suggests that it was formed by subsurface water erosion similar to a karst.  MRO discovered sulfates, hydrated sulfates, and iron oxides in Candor Chasma.

One of the pictures below shows branched channels.  Many places on Mars show channels of different sizes.  Many of these channels probably carried water, at least for a time.  The climate of Mars may have been such in the past that water ran on its surface.  It has been known for some time that Mars undergoes many large changes in its tilt or obliquity because its two small moons lack the gravity to stabilize it, as the Moon stabilizes Earth; at times the tilt of Mars has even been greater than 80 degrees

Gallery

See also
 Chasma

References

External links
HiRISE observation of tectonic fractures
Virtual flyover of Candor Chasma at an altitude of 100 meters by Adrian Lark and Mars3D.com; see album for more
High resolution flyover video by Seán Doran of layered terrain in southwest Candor Chasma, and more videos of Ceti Mensa, based on NASA digital terrain models; see album for more
Flyover video of Ceti Mensa and west Candor Chasma by Carter Emmart; see album for more

Valleys and canyons on Mars
Coprates quadrangle